Sun Hongbin (born 1963) is a Chinese American real estate developer. He is the founder, chairman, and majority owner of Sunac.

Early life
Sun was born in Shanxi province in 1963.

Sun received his undergraduate education at the Wuhan Water Conservancy and Electric Power College (which merged into Wuhan University in 2000) and graduated in 1981. He received a Master of Engineering from Tsinghua University in 1985. He attended a six-week advanced management program at Harvard Business School in 2000.

Career
Sun is the chairman and majority shareholder of Sunac, the Chinese property group.

In 1992, he was jailed in China following an embezzlement conviction which was later overturned.

In October 2017 he was ordered to do "26 hours of re-education in corporate governance" after being censured for having broken the listing rules of the Hong Kong Stock Exchange.

Personal life
Sun attains the Citizenship of the United States, and lives in Tianjin, China. He is married with two children.

References

1963 births
Living people
20th-century Chinese businesspeople
21st-century Chinese businesspeople
American billionaires
American real estate businesspeople
Businesspeople from Shanxi
Chinese billionaires
Chinese company founders
Chinese emigrants to the United States
Chinese real estate businesspeople
People from Yuncheng
Tsinghua University alumni